Jonathan Strong may refer to:
Jonathan Strong (author) (1944–), an American author
Jonathan Strong (slave) (–1773), a West Indian slave